Anjuman-i-Ulama-i-Bangala ( Assembly of the Scholars of Bengal), was an association of Muslim religious leaders in British India's Bengal Presidency. It later formed a branch of the Jamiat Ulema-e-Hind by the name Jamiat Ulema-e-Bangala in 1921.

History
The association was established in March 1913 at a conference in Beniapara, Bogra by some of Bengal's most senior scholars such as Abul Kalam Azad, Muhammad Abdullahil Baqi and Muhammad Shahidullah. The first president and secretary of the Anjuman was Mohammad Akram Khan with Maniruzzaman Islamabadi as joint secretary. Ismail Hossain Siraji was also a notable member of the organisation. Aiming to bring about Muslim unity, regardless of sects, and prevent Muslims from converting to Christianity.

On 3 May 1915, the association initiated an illustrated monthly Bengali publication known as Al-Eslam, with Akram as chief editor. Notable writers for the paper included Begum Rokeya and Fazlul Hoque Selbarsi. Over 1500 copies were in circulation. It contained articles on history, literature, philosophy, and cultural heritage.

Two years later, they hosted their second conference in Calcutta. The third conference took place in Patiya in August 1919. Promoting Hindu–Muslim unity, the organisation actively participated in anti-colonial uprisings such as the Khilafat Movement as well as Gandhi's Non-cooperation movement. They opened a Swadeshi-Khilafat store in Calcutta, promoting the sale of native goods. The uprisings changed the socio-politics in India and the association was eventually disbanded in 1921 to merge with the Jamiat Ulema-e-Bangala, a regional branch of the Jamiat Ulema-e-Hind.

Aims
Its aims included providing Islamic education, countering hostility and misconceptions preached by Christian missionaries as well as reforming and uniting Muslim society to an orthodox fashion through the Quran and Sunnah. This included actively educating unlettered and illiterate Muslims of Bengal and Assam about shirk and bidʻah. At the same time, the organisation promoted Hindu–Muslim unity. Many maktabs, madrasas, bayt al-mal and social arbitration boards were founded and funded by the organisation; bringing about solidarity and a strong morale amongst Muslims. They popularised the use of the Bengali language amongst the Muslim middle-class. There was also an aspiration of establishing an Islamic university in Chittagong although this never came into being.

Members

See also
Faraizi Movement
Muharram Rebellion
Titumir

References

Defunct Islamic organizations
Islamic organisations based in India
Islamic organizations established in 1913
Islamic organisations based in Bangladesh
Sunni organizations
Islam in Assam

bn:আঞ্জুমান-ই-উলামা-ই-বাঙ্গালা
hi:अंजुमन ए उलमा ए बंगाला
pnb:انجمن علماء بنگالہ
ur:انجمن علماء بنگالہ